Bariadi is a Tanzanian town and regional
capital of Simiyu Region, and the is also administrative seat of Bariadi District. Bariadi also refers to Bariadi Ward, another administrative unit in the district.

Location
Bariadi is located in Bariadi Ward, Bariadi District, Simiyu Region, in Tanzania.

The geographical coordinates of Bariadi are:02°47'31.0"S, 33°59'22.0"E (Latitude:-2.791944; Longitude:33.989444).

Overview
Bariadi was elevated to Town Council Status in 2012. It comprises ten wards; Bariadi, Somanda, Sima, Malambo, Nyangokolwa, Guduwi, Nyakabindi and Bunahmala.

According to the satellite map of the town, Bariadi as several primary and secondary schools, several churches of various religious denominations, a number of restaurants and branches of two of Tanzania's largest banks; CRDB Bank and National Microfinance Bank.

Population
The population of Bariadi Town Council, as constituted in 2012, comprising 10 wards, was 155,620 of whom 81,772 (52.55 percent) were female and 73,848 (47.45 percent) were male, with an annual population growth rate of 2.048 percent. The average family size was 6.4 people, according to the 2012 national population census.

Climate

The town has two seasons; (a) a rainy season that begins around mid-October and stretches until mid-May, with a dry spell in January, and (b) a dry season that begins in mid-May and lasts until mid-October.

Transport
The paved  Isebania–Shinyanga Road, passes through the town, in a general north to south direction.

References

External links
 Saving for solar in Bariadi Tanzania As of 26 August 2015.

Regional capitals in Tanzania
Bariadi District
Populated places in Simiyu Region